The United Kingdom held a national preselection to choose the song that would go to the Eurovision Song Contest 1972.

Before Eurovision

Artist selection 
Contemporary press reports suggested that Cliff Richard was the first artist selected to represent the UK in 1972 by the BBC, but he was already committed to a concert on the date of the contest - 25 March 1972 - and was thus unavailable. As The New Seekers were booked to appear on his 1972 UK series, the BBC opted to offer them the opportunity. The group had just spent five weeks at No.2 with the song "Never Ending Song of Love" when they were confirmed as the UK entrants and their single "I'd Like to Teach the World to Sing" hit No.1 for four weeks at the same week the group began presenting the six short listed songs weekly on the Cliff Richard show.

A Song for Europe 1972 
The show was held on 12 February 1972 and presented by Cliff Richard as a special edition of his BBC1 TV series It's Cliff Richard! All songs were performed by the group The New Seekers, the first group ever to represent the UK in the contest and the first quintet ever to appear in Eurovision as a group. "Beg, Steal or Borrow" was chosen by viewers who cast votes via postcard through the mail. The UK was undergoing national and regional power cuts during the winter of 1972, due to a coal mining strike, leading to many viewers missing the broadcast of the six songs and the result the following week. The postal vote was thus lower than in previous years, but the winner still received 62,584 votes.

Chart success 
The group released all six songs from the UK final shortly after the contest. The winner, together with the runner up "One By One", was released on single and spent three weeks at No. 2 in the UK singles chart. Both tracks were then included in the album We'd Like to Teach the World to Sing, together with the last placed song "Songs of Praise". The album was also a No. 2 hit in the UK. Roy Wood who had composed the last placed entry released his own version of the track on the B-side of his 1973 No. 18 hit "Dear Elaine". Later in 1972, the remaining three songs from the UK final were released by The New Seekers in the budget LP What Have They Done To My Song, Ma? released on the Contour label. In subsequent years, all six songs by the group have been released on CD compilations.

At Eurovision
"Beg, Steal or Borrow" won the national and went on to come second in the contest.

This was also the only Eurovision Song Contest between 1971 and 2008 in which Terry Wogan had no involvement with. Actor and royal commentator Tom Fleming provided the BBC Television commentary, whilst Pete Murray provided the radio commentary for BBC Radio 1 and 2 listeners.

Voting

References

1972
Countries in the Eurovision Song Contest 1972
Eurovision
Eurovision